Anette Rückes (born 19 December 1951 in Bad Marienberg, Rhineland-Palatinate) is a German athlete who competed mainly in the 400 metres.

She competed for West Germany in the 1972 Summer Olympics held in Munich in the 4 x 400 metres where she won the bronze medal with her teammates Inge Bödding, Hildegard Falck and Rita Wilden.

References

 

1951 births
Living people
People from Westerwaldkreis
West German female sprinters
Athletes (track and field) at the 1972 Summer Olympics
Olympic athletes of West Germany
Olympic bronze medalists for West Germany
Medalists at the 1972 Summer Olympics
Olympic bronze medalists in athletics (track and field)
Olympic female sprinters
Sportspeople from Rhineland-Palatinate